Rosemary Alison Mair (born 7 November 1998) is a New Zealand cricketer. In January 2019, she was named in New Zealand's squad for their series against India.

Mair made her Women's Twenty20 International cricket (WT20I) debut for New Zealand against India Women on 6 February 2019. She made her Women's One Day International cricket (WODI) debut for New Zealand against Australia Women on 22 February 2019. In January 2020, she was named in New Zealand's squad for the 2020 ICC Women's T20 World Cup in Australia. In February 2022, she was named in New Zealand's team for the 2022 Women's Cricket World Cup in New Zealand. In June 2022, Mair was named in New Zealand's team for the cricket tournament at the 2022 Commonwealth Games in Birmingham, England.

References

External links
 
 

1998 births
Living people
New Zealand women cricketers
New Zealand women Twenty20 International cricketers
New Zealand women One Day International cricketers
Cricketers from Napier, New Zealand
Central Districts Hinds cricketers
Melbourne Renegades (WBBL) cricketers
Melbourne Stars (WBBL) cricketers
Cricketers at the 2022 Commonwealth Games
Commonwealth Games bronze medallists for New Zealand
Commonwealth Games medallists in cricket
Medallists at the 2022 Commonwealth Games